Athang Gewog (Dzongkha: ཨ་ཐང་) is a gewog (village block) of Wangdue Phodrang District, Bhutan.

Athang Gewog is one of the most remotest Gewogs in Wangdue Phodrang District. Two Chiwogs, namely Lopokha-Phaktakha and Lomtshokha makes up the Athang Gewog and Rukha village is composed of two Chiwongs(Lawa Lamga and Rukha). With the settlements widely scattered, the Gewog covers an estimated area of 746 km2.

References 

Gewogs of Bhutan
Wangdue Phodrang District